Danielithosia pallens is a moth of the family Erebidae. It is found in Japan (Ryukyus).

References

Moths described in 1980
Lithosiina
Moths of Japan